The 2016–17 Eastern Counties Football League season (known as the 2016–17 Thurlow Nunn Eastern Counties Football League for sponsorship reasons) was the 74th in the history of the Eastern Counties Football League, a football competition in England.

Premier Division

The Premier Division featured 18 clubs which competed in the division last season, along with three new clubs, promoted from the Division One:
Ely City
Great Yarmouth Town
Wivenhoe Town

League table

Promotion criteria	
To be promoted at the end of the season a team must:	
 Have applied to be considered for promotion by the end of November 	
 Pass a ground grading examination by the end of March	
 Finish the season in a position higher than that of any other team also achieving criteria 1 and 2	
 Finish the season in one of the top three positions

The following four teams have achieved criterion one:
 Felixstowe & Walton United
 Mildenhall Town
 Newmarket Town
 Stanway Rovers

Division One

Division One featured 16 clubs which competed in the division last season, along with five new clubs:
Coggeshall Town, promoted from Essex and Suffolk Border League
Framlingham Town, promoted from the Suffolk and Ipswich League
Holland, promoted from the Essex and Suffolk Border League
Whitton United, relegated from the Premier Division
Wisbech St Mary, promoted from the Cambridgeshire County League

League table

References

External links
 Eastern Counties Football League

Eastern Counties Football League seasons
9